A Senior Enlisted Advisor (SEA) in the United States Armed Forces is the most senior enlisted service member in a unit, and acts as an advisor to the commanding officer. Formally, E-9 billets for the senior enlisted advisor are established at Service unit (e.g., battalion, wing, or higher), command, major command, force, or fleet levels to the SEAs/CSELs of DoD Agencies and the Senior Enlisted Advisor to the Chairman of the Joint Chiefs of Staff. SEAs are also known as Command Senior Enlisted Leaders (CSEL). Always a non-commissioned officer, the SEA is the main link between the commanding officer and the enlisted service members under his or her charge.

Examples

In the United States Army, the SEA for a battalion or larger-sized unit is usually a Command Sergeant Major. For Marine battalions and larger, a Sergeant Major typically takes the role. Navy ships and other commands will usually have a Command, Fleet, or Force Master Chief Petty Officer (known as the Chief of the Boat on a submarine), while an Air Force or Space Force Command Chief Master Sergeant serves at Wing, Delta, Numbered Air Force, Field Operating Agency (FOA), Major Command, Field Command or at "Joint," DoD Agency levels.

In the United States Army and the United States Marine Corps, the senior enlisted advisor at the company or battery level (or other unit at similar echelon) is a First Sergeant. In the Air Force and Space Force, the senior enlisted member of units smaller than those listed above for Command Chief Master Sergeant is either a Chief Master Sergeant or a Senior Master Sergeant and may also include a separate First Sergeant authorization. In the Air Force a First Sergeant can be an E7, E8 or E9, depending on size and mission of the unit, and is a temporary, special duty assignment.

International equivalents

Australia
In Australia the equivalent positions within the Royal Australian Navy (RAN), Australian Army and Royal Australian Air Force (RAAF) are Warrant Officer of the Navy (WO-N), Regimental Sergeant Major-Army (RSM-A) and Warrant Officer of the Air Force (WOFF-AF) respectively.

Canada
The Senior Enlisted advisor of the Canadian Forces is the Canadian Forces Chief Warrant Officer. The Army, Navy and Air Force each have their own Chief Warrant Officer acting as Senior Enlisted advisor.

NATO
NATO also has a number of Senior Enlisted Advisors taken from NATO members for various posts, including Senior Enlisted Advisor - NATO Allied Command Transformation

New Zealand
In New Zealand the equivalent positions within the Royal New Zealand Navy (RNZN), New Zealand Army and Royal New Zealand Air Force (RNZAF) are Warrant officer of the Navy (New Zealand) (WON), Sergeant Major of the Army (SMA) and Warrant Officer of the Air Force (WOAF) respectively. there is also the Senior position within HQNZDF of the Warrant Officer of the Defence Force (WODF)
WODR

South Africa
South Africa has a Warrant officer of the Defence Force, as well as Sergeant Majors of the Army, Air Force and Medical Services. The Navy equivalent is the Master at Arms of the Navy

United Kingdom
The Royal Navy has the Warrant Officer of the Naval Service, the British Army has the Army Sergeant Major, the Royal Air Force has the Chief of the Air Staff's Warrant Officer and the Royal Marines the Corps Regimental Sergeant Major. In 2018, the Senior Enlisted Advisor to the Chiefs of Staff Committee was introduced.

References

 Senior Enlisted Advisor on the Dictionary of Occupational Titles
 Senior Enlisted Advisor on TheFreeDictionary.com

United States military specialisms